John Thomas Smith (22 June 1881 – 10 December 1927) was an Australian rules footballer who played with Melbourne in the Victorian Football League (VFL).

Family
The son of Alfred Smith (1847–1923), and Mary Anne Smith (1855–1896), née Heslem, John Thomas Smith was born on 22 June 1881.

He married Alice Bell (1875–1960) in 1910.

Football

North Melbourne (VFA)
He played 85 games, and scored 33 goals for North Melbourne in the Victorian Football Association (VFA) from 1898 to 1906; and he was captain of the team in 1905 and 1906.

Melbourne (VFL)
He was cleared from North Melbourne to Melbourne in the Victorian Football League (VFL) in 1907. He played 41 games, and kicked 26 goals in three seasons (1907 to 1909).

Launceston (NTFA)
Cleared from Melbourne to the Launceston Football Club in the Northern Tasmanian Football Association (NTFA), he served as its captain-coach in 1910.

Melbourne (VFL)
He returned to Melbourne in 1911, and played another 10 games during the 1911 season.

Cananore (TSL)
He was cleared from Melbourne to captain-coach the Cananore Football Club in the Tasmanian State League (TSL) in 1912.

Notes

References

External links 

 
 
 Jack Smith, at Demonwiki.
 Jack "Ching" Smith, at The VFA Project.
 Jack Smith, at Boyles Football Photos.

1881 births
1927 deaths
Australian rules footballers from Victoria (Australia)
North Melbourne Football Club (VFA) players
Melbourne Football Club players
Launceston Football Club players
Launceston Football Club coaches
Cananore Football Club players